is a Japanese media franchise owned by ForwardWorks, with Oji Hiroi credited as the original creator. It primarily consists of a smartphone game, released for Android and iOS on September 28, 2017. A Microsoft Windows version by DMM was originally announced to be released in Q2 2018, but was ultimately never launched. The game's service ended on May 7, 2019. An anime television series adaptation by TMS Entertainment aired from October 4 to December 20, 2018. Sentai Filmworks have licensed the series.

Characters

A girl from Tokyo who went to the city of Onomichi to pursue her dream of becoming a space fisherman. She is very fond of her grandmother, who had raised her as her parents had separated when she was young, as well as cute things such as cats.

A girl from Onomichi who is the most experienced of the group. She initially dislikes Haru due to Haru failing in her first fishing mission. Her favorite food is pancakes.

A Japanese-American girl from California who joins the group after saving them when a training session went wrong. She calls herself a "spy" and came to Japan in order to find out about Japan's space fishing technology.

A girl from Akita Prefecture who has a shy personality. It is revealed that she decided to become a space fisherman in order to find information on her older brother, who had disappeared in a fishing expedition years before. She is also initially afraid of water due to an incident during her childhood, but later overcomes this fear.

A girl from Kumamoto Prefecture who joined the group at the same time as Haru. She is fond of outdoor activities such as cycling. She also used to date older men as a result of her father, who works in the space fishing ministry, frequently being away from home. It is later revealed that her father had covered up the disappearance of Maiko's brother during the first space fishing expedition.

A girl from Kyoto who is descended from a line of swordmakers. She decided to become a space fisherman despite having a fear of water because she wanted to prove her abilities to her family.

Media

Manga
A manga adaptation was serialized by ASCII Media Works in their Dengeki Daioh magazine between September 2017 and November 2018. The series was compiled into two tankōbon volumes.

Anime
An anime television series adaptation was announced on July 25, 2017. Atsushi Nigorikawa directed the anime at TMS Entertainment, and Takashi Yamada is in charge of series composition. Shūhei Yamamoto drawn the character designs. The series aired from October 4 to December 20, 2018, on Tokyo MX and other channels. The series ran for 12 episodes. Crunchyroll streamed the series, while Sentai Filmworks have licensed the series.

Notes

References

External links
 
 

2017 video games
2019 disestablishments in Japan
Android (operating system) games
Anime television series based on video games
ASCII Media Works manga
Crunchyroll anime
Delisted digital-only games
Dengeki Daioh
IOS games
Manga based on video games
Mass media franchises
Products and services discontinued in 2019
Sentai Filmworks
Shōnen manga
Science fiction anime and manga
Sony Interactive Entertainment games
Sony Interactive Entertainment franchises
TMS Entertainment